Gilles-François Closson (1796–1842), born in Liège, was a landscape painter, known as the Corot of Liège. In 1817, he went to Paris for seven years, where he was educated by Antoine-Jean Gros. In 1825 he went to Rome where he specialized in landscapes. He returned to Liège at the end of 1829. He became professor at the Academy of Liège in 1837 until his death.

External links
 

1796 births
1842 deaths
Artists from Liège
Belgian painters